Count Aleksey Sergeyevich Uvarov (Russian: Алексей Сергеевич Уваров; 28 February 1825 – 29 December 1884) was a Russian archaeologist often considered to be the founder of the study of the prehistory of Russia.

Biography
Uvarov was the son of Count Sergey Uvarov, an influential minister of education. He came to know the leading historians of the period, Mikhail Pogodin and Timofey Granovsky, from an early age. He was educated at the universities of St. Petersburg, Berlin, and Heidelberg. After his father's death, he commemorated his name by instituting (in 1857) the Uvarov Prize, to be awarded by the Academy of Sciences to distinguished writers and historians.

Uvarov's activities as a field archaeologist began with visits to Rostov, Vladimir, Chernigov and other centres of Kievan Rus. Starting in 1854, he excavated the Meryan-Norse settlement at Sarskoe Gorodishche. He summarized his findings in The Meryans and Their Lifestyle as Shown by Kurgan Excavations. Subsequent expeditions took him to Pontic Olbia, Tauric Chersonesus, and Scythian Neapolis.

Uvarov was a towering presence in the history of the Imperial Russian Archaeological Society. During Uvarov's administration, the society would convene one time in three years at some ancient Russian town. More importantly in the long run, Uvarov contributed to the establishment of the State Historical Museum, with the intention of promoting national self-awareness.

Although his judgement was not always accurate and his methods of research may appear amateurish to a modern observer, Uvarov's work greatly advanced knowledge of pre-Slavic cultures inhabiting the European part of the Russian Empire. Two volumes of Russian Archaeology in the Prehistoric Period contain his delineation of Eastern European prehistory.

References

Archaeologists from Saint Petersburg
Counts of the Russian Empire
Russian people of Tatar descent
1825 births
1884 deaths
19th-century archaeologists